Montmagny—L'Islet—Kamouraska—Rivière-du-Loup (formerly Rivière-du-Loup—Montmagny) is a federal electoral district in Quebec, Canada, that has been represented in the House of Commons of Canada since 2004. Its population in 2006 was 97,492. It has the highest percentage of Catholics in Canada (97.1%, 2001 Census).

Geography
The district includes the Regional County Municipalities of Kamouraska, L'Islet, Montmagny and Rivière-du-Loup.

The neighbouring ridings are Bellechasse—Les Etchemins—Lévis, Beauport—Côte-de-Beaupré—Île d'Orléans—Charlevoix, and Rimouski-Neigette—Témiscouata—Les Basques.

Demographics
According to the Canada 2021 Census; 2013 representation

Ethnic groups: 97.1% White, 1.4% Indigenous
Languages: 98.2% French
Religions: 82.6% Christian (75.1% Catholic), 16.8% No religion 
Median income (2020): $38,000
Average income (2020): $44,120

History
The electoral district was created as "Rivière-du-Loup—Montmagny" in 2003 55.5% from Kamouraska—Rivière-du-Loup—Témiscouata—Les Basques and 44.5% from Bellechasse—Etchemins—Montmagny—L'Islet ridings.

Its name was changed after the 2004 election to "Montmagny—L'Islet—Kamouraska—Rivière-du-Loup". The district did not have any boundary changes as a result of the 2012 federal electoral redistribution.

Riding associations
Riding associations are the local branches of political parties:

Members of Parliament
This riding has elected the following Members of Parliament:

DemographicsAccording to the Canada 2006 Census''

 Ethnic groups: 98.9% White
 Languages: 98.9% French
 Religions: (2001) 97.1% Catholic, 1.8% No religion
 Average income: $22,026

The riding is the most Catholic riding in Canada. It is also the most French riding in Canada, by mother tongue, and spoken at home.

Election results

Montmagny—L'Islet—Kamouraska—Rivière-du-Loup, 2013 Representation Order

There were no boundary changes for the 2015 Canadian federal election.

Montmagny—L'Islet—Kamouraska—Rivière-du-Loup, 2003 Representation Order

Rivière-du-Loup—Montmagny, 2003 Representation Order

See also
 List of Canadian federal electoral districts
 Past Canadian electoral districts

References

Campaign expense data from Elections Canada
2011 results from Elections Canada
Riding history from the Library of Parliament
Riding history for Montmagny—L'Islet—Kamouraska—Rivière-du-Loup from the Library of Parliament

Notes

Quebec federal electoral districts
La Pocatière
Montmagny, Quebec
Rivière-du-Loup